Bendisodes is a monotypic moth genus in the family Erebidae erected by George Hampson in 1924. Its only species, Bendisodes aeolia, was described by Druce in 1890. It is found in North America.

The MONA or Hodges number for Bendisodes aeolia is 8656.

References

Further reading

 
 
 
 
 
 
 
 
 

Omopterini
Moths described in 1890
Monotypic moth genera
Articles created by Qbugbot